Linda Zimmerman Holland is a research biologist at Scripps Institution of Oceanography known for her work examining the evolution of vertebrates.

Education and career 
Holland has a B.A. (1962) and an M.A. (1964) from Stanford University. She worked as a research associate at the University of California, San Diego, Scripps Clinic, and Scripps Institution of Oceanography in the period from 1970 until 1998. She earned her Ph.D. from the University of California, San Diego in 2001. She started as a research biologist at Scripps in 1998, and is emeritus as of 2022.
Linda Holland has described in detail some of the early obstacles she faced as a woman scientist starting out in academe in the 1960s and 1970s,

Research 
Holland's early research examined anatomical structures in purple sea urchins, and a protein involved in clotting, Von Willebrand factor. She went on to examine reproduction in sea urchins, salps, and amphioxus, known as lancelet. Holland began collecting amphioxus in Tampa, Florida in 1988, which enabled her to use them as a model system to study evolutionary biology. Holland was the lead scientist on the project analyzing the genome of amphioxus, and her work revealed reuse and copying of genes by amphioxus. Her research also addressed the evolution of bilaterian animals as in her 2013 Holland et al. publication (see image). In 2017 she wrote a history of the use of amphioxus in biological research.

Selected publications

Awards and honors 
In 2014 Holland, and her husband Nick Holland, received the A.O. Kovalevsky Medal for their work on amphioxus. This award also includes being named an honorary member of the Saint Petersburg Society of Naturalists.

References

External links 

 

University of California, San Diego alumni
Stanford University alumni
Living people
Scripps Institution of Oceanography faculty
21st-century American women scientists
21st-century American biologists
Year of birth missing (living people)